Richard Markham is a British educator and former field hockey player for Wales.

Markham studied at Oxford University and represented Wales at the 1998 Commonwealth Games. He is also a schoolteacher, and taught history at Marlborough College before being appointed principal of Hockerill Anglo-European College in 2013.

Pippa Middleton, who was a student at Marlborough, described him as "our fierce but undeniably fanciable coach".

References

Living people
Field hockey players at the 1998 Commonwealth Games
Commonwealth Games competitors for Wales
Welsh male field hockey players
Heads of schools in England
Alumni of the University of Oxford
Year of birth missing (living people)